M.O.D. (abbreviation for Method of Destruction) is an American crossover thrash band from New York City, fronted by Stormtroopers of Death vocalist Billy Milano. The band has been around for  years (minus one hiatus from 1997 to 2001), and released eight studio albums. With M.O.D., Milano sought to continue on the musical path of the bands Anthrax, Stormtroopers of Death (S.O.D.) and Nuclear Assault, mixing shades of hardcore punk with thrash metal and often humorous and politically incorrect lyrics.

History

First four albums (1986–1993)
U.S.A. for M.O.D., the band's debut album, was released in 1987 and produced by S.O.D. bandmate and Anthrax guitarist Scott Ian. The first track, "Aren't You Hungry?", a reworking of an unrecorded S.O.D. song, is notable for the lyric "fuck those niggers' charity", referring to the then-common famine relief activism such as "We Are the World". Later the band apologized. 

M.O.D.'s second effort, Surfin' M.O.D. (1988), was an anomaly, featuring little thrash metal, focusing more on humorous cover songs and a beach party atmosphere. The band would return to their roots on Gross Misconduct (1989), as well as further expand their sound on Rhythm of Fear (1992). It was around this time that Milano performed a reunion show with S.O.D. at The Ritz in New York City.

Aside from playing in support of bands like Anthrax, Megadeth, Exodus, Overkill, Testament, Suicidal Tendencies, Pantera, Lȧȧz Rockit and Pro-Pain, and their music videos getting airplay by Headbangers Ball on MTV, M.O.D. was never able to earn a mainstream audience and had temporarily disbanded between the releases of Gross Misconduct and Rhythm of Fear. This was the first of many break-ups or hiatuses to come.

Devolution, Dictated Aggression, and hiatus (1994–1999)
The following releases, Devolution and Dictated Aggression, suffered from poor distribution and going out of print, despite Milano's heavier style and more serious lyrics. The albums were eventually reissued on Blackout Records in 2004.

Following M.O.D.'s split in 1997, Milano reformed S.O.D., who released a subsequent album, Bigger than the Devil, in 1999.

Reunions (2001–present)
In 2001, Milano reformed M.O.D. with a new lineup, and two years later, released The Rebel You Love to Hate, somewhat of a return to Milano's humorous past with jabs at white suburban rap fans and the war on terrorism. M.O.D. relocated to Austin, Texas, and released the album Red, White & Screwed in October 2007 through Index Entertainment, and launched a supporting tour in summer 2008. The band played its final touring show in the United States on September 13, 2008, however the band still performs periodically (mostly in Austin, Texas, where Milano currently resides).

In May 2013, Milano announced a 25th Anniversary Tour dubbed "The Mexicans on Duty Tour" featuring the band's new lineup.

As early as 2014, M.O.D. began working on their eighth studio album, titled Busted, Broke & American, and later that year, they offered a free download of their first song in seven years "Hermano". In May 2015, the group disbanded due to Billy Milano wanting to focus on his private life. All tours and album plans were cancelled as a result. A month later, however, Milano announced that M.O.D. was still together and planning to finish work on Busted, Broke & American, followed by a tour in support of it. On January 5, 2017, Milano announced that the recording of Busted, Broke & American was finished, and it would be M.O.D.'s final album. The album was released on July 7, 2017, and is M.O.D.'s first release on Megaforce Records since the 1995 compilation album Loved by Thousands, Hated by Millions. The album has been referred to as the "Chinese Democracy of crossover thrash", due to its various delays.

When asked in a March 2018 interview if Busted, Broke & American was their final album, or if there would be a follow-up album, then-bassist Jason French said, "I believe there will be another album. In talking to Billy, he has some things in the works he wants to accomplish and I want to be part of those things as well. If things work out the way we would like them to, I think people are going to be blown away about what's in store for the future."

Members
Current
Billy Milano – vocals
Rob Moschetti – bass
Michael Arrellano – drums
Jason French – guitar

Former

Tim McMurtrie – guitar
Louis Svitek – guitar
Sean Kilkenny – guitar
Tommy Klimchuck – guitar
John Pereksta – guitar, bass
Joe Young – guitar
Joe Affe – guitar
Bernard Langendorf – guitar
Ken Ballone – bass
Jeff Wood – bass
Jake Landrau – bass
John Monte – bass
Chris "Dawson Clawson" Dawson – bass, vocals
Tim Casterline – bass
David "Ziggy" Reinhardt – drums
Keith Davis – drums
Tim Mallare – drums
Dave Chavarri – drums
Tony Scaglione – drums
Darren Verpeut – drums
Danny "DNA" Burkhardt – drums
Derek "Lennon" Lopez – drums

Discography

References

External links
Official Facebook page
Official Myspace page
S.O.D. and M.O.D. fan site

Musical groups established in 1986
Crossover thrash groups
Heavy metal musical groups from New York (state)
Road crew
Nuclear Blast artists
1986 establishments in New York City
American thrash metal musical groups
Megaforce Records artists